This is a bibliography of the works of Frances Trollope.

Novels
The Refugee in America (1832)
The Abess: A Romance (1833)
Tremordyn Cliff (1835)
The Life and Adventures of Jonathan Jefferson Whitlaw: or Scenes on the Mississippi (1836)
The Vicar of Wrexhill (1837)
A Romance of Vienna (1838)
The Widow Barnaby (1839)
The Life and Adventures of Michael Armstrong, the Factory Boy (1839–40 serial) (1840 book)
The Widow Married: a Sequel to The Widow Barnaby (1839–40 serial) (1840 book)
One Fault: a Novel (1840)
Charles Chesterfield: or The Adventures of a Youth of Genius (1840–41 serial) (1841 book)
The Blue Belles of England (1841–42 serial) (1842 book)
The Ward of Thorpe-Combe (1842)
The Barnabys in America: or Adventures of the Widow Wedded (1842–43 serial) (1843 book)
Jessie Phillips: a Tale of the Present Day (1842–43 serial) (1843 book)
Hargrave: or The Adventures of a Man of Fashion (1843)
The Laurringtons: or Superior People (1844)
Young Love: a Novel (1844)
The Robertses on Their Travels (1844–46 serial) (1846 book)
The Attractive Man: a Novel (1846)
Father Eustace: a Tale of the Jesuits (1847)
The Three Cousins: a Novel (1847)
Town and Country: a Novel (1848)
The Young Countess: or Love and Jealousy (1848)
The Lottery of Marriage: a Novel (1849)
The Old World and the New: a Novel (1849)
Petticoat Government: a Novel (1850)
Mrs. Matthews, or Family Mysteries: a Novel (1851)
Second Love, or Beauty and Intellect: a Novel (1851)
Uncle Walter: a Novel (1852)
The Young Heiress: a Novel (1853)
The Life and Adventures of a Clever Woman (1854)
Gertrude: or Family Pride (1855)
Fashionable Life: or Paris and London (1856)

Non-fiction
Domestic Manners of the Americans (1832)
The Mother's Manual (1833)
Belgium and Western Germany in 1833 (1834)
Paris and the Parisians in 1835 (1836)
Vienna and the Austrians (1838)
A Visit to Italy (1842)
Travels and Travelers: A Series of Sketches (1846)

Modern editions
Domestic Manners of the Americans, Penguin Classics, 1997.
Hargrave, Alan Sutton Publishing Limited, 1995.
Jessie Phillips, Nonsuch Classics, 2006.
Paris and the Parisians, Alan Sutton Publishing Limited, 1985.
The Three Cousins, Sutton Publishing Limited, 1997.
The Vicar of Wrexhill, Alan Sutton Publishing Limited, 1996.
The Widow Barnaby, Alan Sutton Publishing Limited, 1995.
Widow Barnaby, Nonsuch Classics, 2007.
Life and Adventures of Michael Armstrong, Nonsuch Classics, 2007.

References

Bibliographies by writer
Bibliographies of British writers